Modern Idyll (also mentioned as Contemporary Idyll) is a satirical novel (viewed alternatively as a thematically linked  short story collection) by Mikhail Saltykov-Shchedrin, started in 1877 and originally serialized by Otechestvennye Zapiski magazine. It came out as a separate edition in 1883 to great public and critical acclaim.

References

Russian satirical novels
Russian political satire
Russian political novels
Picaresque novels
Russian novels adapted into plays
Works originally published in Otechestvennye Zapiski
1883 Russian novels
Novels by Mikhail Saltykov-Shchedrin